Chichester de Windt Crookshank (18 October 1868 – 23 October 1958) , was a British Army officer and Unionist Member of Parliament, for Berwick and Haddington from 1924 until 1929; and for Bootle from 1931 until he retired in 1935.

Military career
Crookshank was commissioned a second lieutenant in the Royal Engineers on 23 July 1887, promoted to lieutenant on 23 July 1890, and to captain on 1 April 1898. He served in the Second Boer War, and was slightly wounded in the Battle of Paardeberg in February 1900). He was then attached to the 7th Infantry division of the South Africa Field Force.

Political career
Crookshank was the Unionist Member of Parliament for Berwick and Haddington from 1924. He was unseated in 1929 by George Sinkinson of the Labour Party; and was returned to the House of Commons as Conservative MP for Bootle at the 1931 general election. In 1932 he was assigned as the King's Body Guard. Crookshank retired at the end of that Parliament in 1935.

Arms

References

External links 
 

1868 births
1958 deaths
Conservative Party (UK) MPs for English constituencies
Unionist Party (Scotland) MPs
UK MPs 1924–1929
UK MPs 1931–1935
Members of the Parliament of the United Kingdom for Scottish constituencies
Politics of East Lothian
Politics of the Scottish Borders
Royal Engineers officers
Honourable Corps of Gentlemen at Arms
Members of the Parliament of the United Kingdom for Liverpool constituencies